Albanian Supercup 2010 is the 17th edition of the Albanian Supercup since its establishment in 1989. The match was contested between the 2009–10 Albanian Cup winners Besa Kavajë and the 2009–10 Albanian Superliga champions Dinamo Tirana.

Details

See also
 2009–10 Albanian Superliga
 2009–10 Albanian Cup

References

2010
Supercup
Albanian Supercup, 2010
Albanian Supercup, 2010